Tianta Subdistrict is a subdistrict within Hexi District, Tianjin, China. It shares border with Machang and Youyi Road Subdistricts to the northeast, Liqizhuang Subdistrict to the south, as well as Shuishang Gongyuan and Tiyu Zhongxin Subdistricts to the west. As of 2010, it had a population of 83,753.

The name Tianta refers to the Tianjin TV Tower that is situated on the section of Weijin River east of the subdistrict.

Geography 
The subdistrict is on the west of Weijin River and north of Fuxing River. Both Weijin South Road and Dongnan Banhuan Expressway run through it.

History

Administrative divisions 
By the end of 2021, Tianta Subdistrict consisted of 14 residential communities. All of them are listed in the table below:

Gallery

References 

Township-level divisions of Tianjin
Hexi District, Tianjin